Ronald Amundson is an American environmental scientist who is currently Professor at University of California, Berkeley.

Early life and education
Amundson received his PhD from the University of California, Riverside in 1984. For this work, he had analyzed the carbon and oxygen stable isotopic ratios of calcium carbonate within the soils in the San Joaquin Valley.

Research
His interests are isotope biogeochemistry, environment history & ethics, ecosystems, pedology and soils. His highest cited paper is "Rapid exchange between soil carbon and atmospheric carbon dioxide driven by temperature change" at 759 times, according to Google Scholar.

Awards and honors 
2019 - Elected Fellow of the American Geophysical Union

Selected publications

References

University of California, Berkeley College of Natural Resources faculty
Environmental scientists
Living people
Year of birth missing (living people)
Fellows of the American Geophysical Union